Robert E. "Bob" Evans (born February 3, 1950) is an American politician. He is a member of the Mississippi House of Representatives from the 91st District, being first elected in 2007. He is a member of the Democratic party.

Evans entered politics after working as a public defender, in which role his clients included Cory Maye.

References

1950 births
Living people
Democratic Party members of the Mississippi House of Representatives
21st-century American politicians